Stephen Lynch (fl. 1504–1523) was the 23rd Mayor of Galway, serving from 1507 to 1510.

Lynch was a son of Dominick Dubh Lynch, Galway's second Mayor, and nephew of Peirce Lynch, the first Mayor.

It was his wife, Margaret Athy, who founded the Augustinian monastery of Forthill while he was on a trading voyage. He may have had a second wife, a daughter of Mayor John Bodkin. He had at least seven sons, one of whom, Nicholas, was mayor in 1554 and 1561.

Following the sudden death by drowning of Mayor Arthur Lynch, Stephen Lynch was elected to fill out his term. He remained Mayor until September 1510, one of the few early mayors to hold office over successive terms.

He continued the work of his father and mother, Anastacia Martin, by extending what would become known as Lynch's Aisle in St. Nicholas' Collegiate Church. The arms of both Lynch and his wife, along with that of his parents, adorn the upper portion of two windows in the aisle.

References
History of Galway, James Hardiman, Galway, 1820
 Old Galway, Maureen Donovan O'Sullivan, 1942
 Henry, William, Role of Honour: The Mayors of Galway City 1485–2001, Galway City Council, 2002.  
 Martyn, Adrian, The Tribes of Galway:1124–1642, Galway, 2016. 

Mayors of Galway
16th-century Irish politicians